full Isaac is the debut studio album by Lotion, released in 1994. The album was named in reference to The Love Boat.

Critical reception
Trouser Press wrote that "Lotion’s songwriting isn’t yet strong enough to connect the dots of [the album's] eclectic canvas, and [Tony] Zajkowski lacks the vocal presence to hold the pieces together. As nice as the parts are, Full Isaac scatters at the mildest breeze." Uncut called the album "a fine debut."

The Village Voice selected full Isaac as a 1994 "Album of the Year."

Track listing
All songs composed by Lotion
"Tear" – 4:17
"Dr. Link" – 4:01
"Paas" – 2:45
"La Boost" – 5:17
"Long" – 2:09
"Pajamas" – 5:03
"Around" – 6:03
"Head" – 3:45
"Dock Ellis" – 3:16
"She Is Weird City" – 4:59
"Love Theme from Santo Gold" – 5:04

Personnel
Lotion
Bill Ferguson – bass
Jim Ferguson – guitar and vocals
Rob Youngberg – drums
Tony Zajkowski – vocals and guitar

Additional musicians
Rasputina – cellos on "Around"
Babe The Blue Ox – wisp vocals and alarms on "La Boost"; rumpus on "Dock Ellis"
Tapan Modak – tabla on "Long"

References

1994 debut albums
Lotion (band) albums
SpinART Records albums